Dorothy Ada Emerson (nee Shirley) (born 15 May 1939 in Manchester, Great Britain) is a British athlete, who mainly competed in the women's high jump event.

Athletics career
She competed for Great Britain in the 1960 Summer Olympics held in Rome, Italy, where she won the silver medal in the high jump jointly with Jarosława Jóźwiakowska. It was the fifth straight silver medal for Britain in this event.

She represented England in the high jump at the 1958 British Empire and Commonwealth Games in Cardiff, Wales. Four years later she competed in the high jump again at the 1962 British Empire and Commonwealth Games in Perth, Western Australia and then won a silver medal at the 1966 British Empire and Commonwealth Games in Kingston, Jamaica. A fourth consecutive Games appearance came in 1970 during the 1970 British Commonwealth Games in Edinburgh.

Personal life
She later went into teaching and worked as a PE teacher at Bentham Grammar School in the West Riding of Yorkshire in the early 1970s.

And later continued a successful and influential teaching career as a Primary School Teacher at St. Michael's Primary School in Alkrington, Middleton.

References

External links 
 

1939 births
Living people
Sportspeople from Manchester
British female high jumpers
English female high jumpers
Olympic athletes of Great Britain
Olympic silver medallists for Great Britain
Athletes (track and field) at the 1960 Summer Olympics
Athletes (track and field) at the 1968 Summer Olympics
European Athletics Championships medalists
Athletes (track and field) at the 1958 British Empire and Commonwealth Games
Athletes (track and field) at the 1962 British Empire and Commonwealth Games
Athletes (track and field) at the 1966 British Empire and Commonwealth Games
Athletes (track and field) at the 1970 British Commonwealth Games
Commonwealth Games silver medallists for England
Commonwealth Games medallists in athletics
Medalists at the 1960 Summer Olympics
Olympic silver medalists in athletics (track and field)
Medallists at the 1966 British Empire and Commonwealth Games